Matteo Blomqvist-Zampi (born 15 August 1990) is a retired Italian-born Swedish footballer who played as a forward.

References

External links
 (archive)

1990 births
Living people
Association football forwards
Östers IF players
Falkenbergs FF players
Swedish footballers
Allsvenskan players